Bert A. Clemens (August 15, 1874 – February 2, 1935) was an American farmer, businessman, and politician.

Born in Cuba City, Wisconsin, Clemens went to business school. He was a farmer. Clemens became involved with real estate and insurance in 1926. From 1933 until his death in 1935, Clemens served in the Wisconsin State Assembly and was a Republican. Clemens died of pneumonia at his home shortly after starting his second term in the Wisconsin State Assembly.

References

1874 births
1935 deaths
People from Cuba City, Wisconsin
Businesspeople from Wisconsin
Farmers from Wisconsin
Republican Party members of the Wisconsin State Assembly
Deaths from pneumonia in Wisconsin